Lisa Jane Lomas-Bellinger ( Bellinger, born 9 March 1967) is a British former table tennis player. She competed in the 1992 and 1996 Summer Olympics.

Career
Lomas won a silver medal at the 1992 European Table Tennis Championships, losing to Bettine Vriesekoop in the final. She was eliminated in the group stages of the women's singles competition at the 1996 Summer Olympics. Lomas won the women's singles event at the English National Table Tennis Championships four times, and the women's doubles event nine times. Lomas and Jackie Bellinger hold the record for most balls hit back and forth in 60 seconds; they set the record of 173 in 1993.

See also
 List of England players at the World Team Table Tennis Championships

References

External links
 Sports Reference

1967 births
English female table tennis players
Table tennis players at the 1992 Summer Olympics
Table tennis players at the 1996 Summer Olympics
Olympic table tennis players of Great Britain
Living people